The Municipality of Ig is a municipality in central Slovenia. Its seat is the settlement of Ig. It was formed in 1995 from parts of the Municipality of Vič–Rudnik, until then one of the five municipalities that formed the Civic Assembly of Municipalities of Ljubljana. It is part of the traditional region of Inner Carniola and is now included in the Central Slovenia Statistical Region. In the past the area was mostly marshland, but now Ig is a suburban and industrialized municipality. In 2002, it had 5,445 inhabitants.

Settlements
In addition to the municipal seat of Ig, the municipality also includes the following settlements:

 Brest
 Dobravica
 Draga
 Golo
 Gornji Ig
 Iška
 Iška Loka
 Iška Vas
 Kot
 Kremenica
 Matena
 Podgozd
 Podkraj
 Rogatec nad Želimljami
 Sarsko
 Selnik
 Škrilje
 Staje
 Strahomer
 Suša
 Tomišelj
 Visoko
 Vrbljene
 Zapotok

References

External links

 Municipality of Ig on Geopedia
 Official page 

 
1994 establishments in Slovenia
Ig